The Polish–Ottoman War (1620–1621) was a conflict between the Polish–Lithuanian Commonwealth and the Ottoman Empire over the control of Moldavia. It ended with the Commonwealth withdrawing its claims on Moldavia and to the eventual demise of the Sultan Osman II.

Background
Traditionally, Moldavia had been a subject of the Kingdom of Poland, and later the Polish–Lithuanian Commonwealth. As the Ottoman influence grew in the 16th century, they had become more and more interested in the region.
From the end of the 16th century and the beginning of the 17th century, the magnates of the Polish–Lithuanian Commonwealth intervened in the affairs of Moldavia, which the Ottoman Empire considered within its sphere of influence. Additionally, the Ottomans were aggravated by the constant raids of Cossacks, then nominally subjects of the Commonwealth, across the border into Ottoman territories.
Another reason causing the war was the recent outbreak of the Thirty Years' War, and the request of support from the Protestant rebel leaders in Bohemia.

At the time, the Thirty Years' War was raging across Europe. Gabriel Bethlen, prince of Transylvania saw an opportunity to unite the two Hungarian principalities, Transylvania and Royal Hungary, and sacked Vienna in November 1619. He also asked Sultan Osman II for aid, but this was unsuccessful. The Commonwealth was relatively uninvolved in this war but the Polish king, Zygmunt III Waza, sent an elite and ruthless mercenary unit, the Lisowczycy, to aid his Habsburg allies. They defeated the Hungarian lord George Rákóczi at the Battle of Humenné in 1619, and thus, cut the supply lines of Transylvanian forces. Then Gaspar Graziani, ruler of Moldavia, switched sides and joined Poland.

Thus, the sultan agreed to help Bethlen, gathering a large Ottoman army with the intent of a punitive invasion of the Commonwealth.

The war
In 1620, the Ottoman forces crushed the Commonwealth army at the Battle of Ţuţora (Cecora). The campaign was suspended for the winter but, in 1621, both sides resumed hostilities.

The Turks, following their victory in the Battle of Ţuţora, had high hopes of conquering Ukraine (then a part of Poland), and perhaps even toppling the Commonwealth entirely and reaching the Baltic Sea. This time, however, they were stopped by a Commonwealth army, aided by a large Cossack detachment, at the Battle of Khotyn. The 45,000 Poles and Cossacks were able to withstand an Ottoman army at least two times the size of the Commonwealth's army at Khotyn and deal severe losses to the Ottoman army throughout the month of September. When the Polish cavalry rallied forth in October they broke the will of the besiegers and the Sultan sued for peace. The ensuing peace treaty resulted in no border change, but the Commonwealth agreed to stop its interference in Moldavia. Both sides claimed victory, as the Commonwealth saw the battle of Khotyn as a successful stopping of the Ottoman invasion of its mainland and the Ottoman Empire achieved its goal of removing the impending threat on the Moldavian lands.

The Polish–Ottoman border would remain relatively peaceful until the Polish–Ottoman War (1633–34) and the Polish–Ottoman War (1672–76).

See also
Moldavian Magnate Wars

Notes

References
 Wojny polsko-tureckie, Encyklopedia WIEM

External links
Polish Warfare: 1618–1621 War with Turkey
 Wojna 1620–1621
 WOJNY POLSKO TURECKIE W PIERWSZEJ POŁOWIE XVII WIEKU
 "Battle of Khotyn / Chocim 1621" - movie produced on 400th anniversary of the battle.

Conflicts in 1620
Wars involving Moldavia
Polish–Ottoman wars
Wars involving Wallachia
Warfare of the Early Modern period
1620 in Europe
1621 in Europe
1620 in the Ottoman Empire
1621 in the Ottoman Empire
Conflicts in 1621